Joseph Edward McAleer (8 March 1910 – date of death unknown) was a Scottish professional footballer. He played for a total of 11 clubs, playing in Scotland, England, Northern Ireland, Ireland and Wales.

References

1910 births

Year of death missing
Date of death unknown
Scottish footballers
English Football League players
Arbroath F.C. players
Rochdale A.F.C. players
Glenavon F.C. players
Northampton Town F.C. players
Lincoln City F.C. players
Leyton Orient F.C. players
Gillingham F.C. players
Wrexham A.F.C. players
Partick Thistle F.C. players
Glentoran F.C. players
Association footballers not categorized by position